Peter H. Christensen is the Arthur Satz Professor of the Humanities at the University of Rochester. He has held a Guggenheim Fellowship and is a former member of the Institute for Advanced Study.

Education
Christensen graduated with a professional degree in architecture from Cornell University in 2005 and studied at Harvard University and Humboldt University of Berlin on a Fulbright Program fellowship before completing his Ph.D. at Harvard in 2014.

Curatorial and academic career
From 2005 to 2008 Christensen served as Curatorial Assistant in the Department of Architecture and Design at the Museum of Modern Art where he co-curated the 2008 exhibition "Home Delivery: Fabricating the Modern Dwelling" with Barry Bergdoll. The catalogue for this exhibition won the 2010 Philip Johnson Exhibition Catalogue Award from the Society of Architectural Historians.

Christensen's academic research focuses on the intersection of architectural history, environmental history, and infrastructure studies, with a focus on 19th and 20th century international architectural history, particularly of Central, Southeastern Europe and Ottoman and post-Ottoman lands. His book, Germany and the Ottoman Railways: Art, Empire, and Infrastructure (Yale University Press, 2017) was awarded the 2020 Alice Davis Hitchcock Award from the Society of Architectural Historians for "the most distinguished work of scholarship in the history of architecture published by a North American scholar."

Christensen runs facial recognition on buildings as a digital humanities project, "Architectural Biometrics."

In 2022, Christensen, noted as "an internationally recognized scholar of architectural history and design," was named the Ani and Mark Gabrellian Director of the Humanities Center at the University of Rochester.

Selected works

 Precious Metal: German Steel, Modernity, and Ecology, Penn State University Press (2022)
 (as editor) Buffalo at the Crossroads: The Past, Present, and Future of American Urbanism (2020)
 (as editor) Expertise and Architecture in the Modern Islamic World: A Critical Anthology (2018)
 Germany and the Ottoman Railway Network: Art, Empire and Infrastructure (2017)
 (as editor) Architecturalized Asia: Mapping a Continent Through History (2014)
 (with Mohsen Mostafavi) Instigations: Engaging Architecture, Landscape and the City (2012)
 (with Barry Bergdoll) Home Delivery: Fabricating the Modern Dwelling (2008)

References 

Living people
University of Rochester faculty
American art historians
Cornell University alumni
Harvard University alumni
Humboldt University of Berlin alumni
Year of birth missing (living people)